Urszulin is a village in Włodawa County, Lublin Voivodeship, in eastern Poland. It is the seat of the gmina (administrative district) called Gmina Urszulin.

The village has a population of 800.

It is a legal address of Polesie National Park.

References

Villages in Włodawa County
Siedlce Governorate
Kholm Governorate
Lublin Voivodeship (1919–1939)